Baghdad Bounedjah (born 24 November 1991) is an Algerian professional footballer who plays as a striker for Qatar Stars League club Al Sadd and the Algeria national team.

Throughout his club career, Bounedjah has played for Algerian sides RCG Oran and USM El Harrach, and Tunisian side Étoile du Sahel, before joining Qatari club Al Sadd in 2015. In the 2018–19 Qatar Stars League season, he scored a league record of 39 goals in one season, and was the world's leading goalscorer during the 2018 calendar year with 58 goals overall.

At international level, Bounedjah made his senior debut for Algeria in 2014 and has represented his nation at the 2016 Summer Olympics, and two editions of the Africa Cup of Nations. He was a member of the squad that won the 2019 Africa Cup of Nations and scored the winning goal in the final of the competition.

Club career

RCG Oran
Baghdad started his career in his native city with RCG Oran when he played in the all youth categories until he arrives in senior in 2009 when he played two seasons. In 2011, he joined USM El Harrach.

USM El Harrach
In the summer of 2011, Bounedjah signed a two-year contract with USM El Harrach, joining them from amateur club RCG Oran. On 10 September 2011, he made his professional debut for the club as a starter in the first-round game of the 2011–12 Algerian Ligue Professionnelle 1 against MC Oran, scoring a goal in the 78th minute.

Étoile du Sahel
In June 2013, Bounedjah joined with the club of Sousse, Étoile Sportive du Sahel, with which he signed a three-year contract. This transfer was made official a month later, when his former employer, who disputed this transfer. On 26 September 2013, He made his debut for the team in Tunisian Professional League 1 against US Monastir, also scored his first goal with the club. He quickly became an essential part of the ES Sahel, and finished top scorer in the 2014 Tunisian Professional League 1 in his first year, scoring 14 goals in 23 games. This earned him the extension of his initial three-year contract, an additional year, the link now to the club until June 2017. On 11 August 2013, Bounedjah, won his first title with Étoile du Sahel. The Algerian striker offered the 2013–14 Tunisian Cup to his club at the expense of CS Sfaxien, in the final at Rades. In the second season, Bounedjah continued to shine and On 25 September 2014, scored his first hat-trick in Tunisian Ligue Pro 1 against EGS Gafsa in 3–0 victory. to finish the Professional League 1 with 11 goals in second place the same thing with Étoile du Sahel where they failed to win the championship, two points behind Club Africain. But again he won the Tunisian Cup for the second time in a row, this time against Stade Gabèsien and scored Bounedjah a hat-trick. Then continued to shine and this time in the CAF Confederation Cup and thus contributed to the victory of Étoile du Sahel title and achieved at the same time the title of the top scorer.

Al Sadd

2015–16 season
On 29 April 2015, Bounedjah moved to Qatar's Al Sadd, but he remained at Étoile du Sahel for a six-month loan period. Indeed, the Qatari club having already reached its quota of foreign players, decided to leave the player on loan to the Sahelian training for the first part of the season before returning to his workforce. During his loan, Bounedjah was seriously injured. Ankle injury which kept him out for nearly three months On 7 March 2016, He made his debut for the team in Qatar Stars League against Al-Gharafa, later Bounedjah scored the winning goal against Al-Kharaitiyat his first goal with the club. and with the end of a difficult season for him and his team participated only in ten games and scored seven goals in all competitions.

2016–17 season
In his second season and On 7 December 2016, Bounedjah scored his first hat-trick in Qatar Stars League against Al-Rayyan in 5–0 victory. his 13 goals in Qatar this season. later on 16 February 2017 Bounedjah scored another hat trick this time against Al-Arabi In this match, Bounedjah scored five goals for the first time in his career. At the end of the season, his team failed to win the league title, two points behind Lekhwiya, but achieved the title of the top goalscorer in the Qatari Stars league with 24 goals alongside Lekhwiya's Youssef El-Arabi. With the end of the league, Bounedjah won his first title Qatar Crown Prince Cup after winning the final against El Jaish and also scored a goal. after which Bounedjah achieve his second title by winning the Emir of Qatar Cup against Al-Rayyan. before this final, in the quarter-finals Bounedjah scored a super-hat trick against Al-Kharaitiyat. As a result, Bounedjah finished the season with 30 goals. On 23 May 2017, After his big season he decided to extend his contract, which was due to end in 2018, for three seasons until 2021.

2017–18 season
At the start of his third season at Al Sadd, the 2017–18 campaign On 9 September 2017, First game of the season, first "hat trick" and first title for Bounedjah, during the Qatar Super Cup after beating league champion last season, Al-Duhail 4–1. with the start of the league Bounedjah was aspiring to win the title and the start was good where he scored in six consecutive games until the match against Al-Duhail and defeat 4–2, after this game was exposed again, a difficult injury Shin fracture and kept him out for more than two months, This injury prevented him from competing for the title of goal scorer against his opponent last season Youssef El-Arabi, and after returning from injury and only in five matches Bounedjah scored ten goals in Qatar Stars League including a super-hat trick against Al-Ahli The fourth goal is the 50 in all competitions with Al Sadd. In the AFC Champions League and after a seven-year absence from the group stage Al-Sadd placed its focus on it, as well as Bounedjah Where he was remarkably successful scoring nine goals in eight games, Including four binaries against Al-Wasl back and forth, Persepolis and Al-Ahli in the Round of 16. To finish the season strongly with 28 goals in all competitions.

2018–19 season
On 5 August 2018, Bounedjah scored a hat-trick in the first game of the season against Al-Kharaitiyat one week later, Bounedjah broke the Qatar Stars League single-game goal record, scoring seven goals in a 10–1 win against Al Arabi. Bounedjah continued his success at the individual level by winning the top scorer of the 2018 AFC Champions League with 13 goals to become the first Algerian and the first player from a Qatari club to achieve this award. The Al-Sadd forward matched the all-time single tournament record held by Muriqui who netted the same tally by the conclusion of Guangzhou Evergrande's 2013 campaign. despite failing to reach the final after a semi-final elimination against Persepolis. And continue to pursue and score goals with the club and the national team and his arrival at the barrier 50 goals in 2018, newspapers in Qatar and Europe spoke about the offer from Olympique Marseille to the Algerian star in the winter transfer. Bounedjah said that, "if I get an offer from a good club I will leave Al Sadd but if it's the opposite I'll stay here". On 2 December 2018, Bounedjah scored another hat-trick, his fourth for the season and this time against Al-Gharafa in 8–1 victory. On 7 December 2018, Bounedjah set a new top goalscorer record for the Qatar Stars League with 28 goals after just 14 matches, breaking the record previously held by Brazilian striker Clemerson de Araújo, who scored 27 goals in 2007–08.

By the end of 2018, Bounedjah managed to beat several stars such as Cristiano Ronaldo and Lionel Messi as the world's top scorer after reaching goal 58, including 29 in Qatar Stars League this season, ten last season in the same competition, 13 in the Champions League and seven with the Algeria national team. Bounedjah is also the first Algerian to have scored a total of 50 goals in a year and far ahead of his teammates in the selection Islam Slimani or Riyad Mahrez and even Nacer Bouiche who had exceeded 40 goals in 1986 with JS Kabylie. On 28 December 2018, Bounedjah decided to renew his contract until 2024 despite the offers he received from several European clubs. With the start of the new year, Bounedjah won another individual award, this time the best Algerian player of 2018, ahead of his teammates Riyad Mahrez and Yacine Brahimi, The award was conferred by the Brazilian star Roberto Carlos. Bounedjah is the first footballer based outside Europe and Algeria to win the award. On 23 February 2019, Bounedjah scored in the Qatari Classico against Al-Rayyan, bringing his tally with Al Sadd to 100 goal in all competitions, making him the first Algerian player based outside of Europe to claim this accolade with a single club. On 4 April 2019, Bounedjah scored his sixth hat-trick of the season (and 39th goal in total - a league record) against Al-Ahli to lead Al Sadd SC to win their first Qatar Stars League title in six seasons, is also the first league title for Bounedjah in its history.

2019–20 season
After the end of the Africa Cup of Nations, Bounedjah cut off his holiday early to prepare for the new league season, which had an early start. On 13 August 2019, Bounedjah and his team qualified for the quarter-finals of the AFC Champions League after winning against rivals Al-Duhail; he registered an assist for Akram Afif in the second leg. After missing two games because of the penalty and in his first Qatar Stars League match against Al-Shahania he scored four goals in the 7–1 win. On 11 December, he scored the first goal at the 2019 FIFA Club World Cup and earned the Man of the Match award for his performance in his side's 3–1 First Round win over 2019 OFC Champions League winners Hienghène Sport in extra time. He ultimately scored a tournament-high three goals as Al-Sadd ended sixth.

2020–21 season
The start of the season was late due to the COVID-19 pandemic in Qatar and from the tournaments that have been postponed to this season the 2020 Emir of Qatar Cup, Bounedjah led his club to win the title where he scored the two winning goals in the final against Al-Arabi which is his second title in the same competition. On 23 December 2020, Bounedjah scored the 100th goal in the Qatar Stars League by scoring the winning goal against Al-Rayyan. On 7 January 2021, Bounedjah scored his first hat-trick of the season against Al-Sailiya in 8–0 victory and provided two assists. Five days later Bounedjah scored another hat-trick against defending champions Al-Duhail in a 3–1 win.

On 26 February 2021, in the final of the Qatar Cup, Bounedjah scored twice in Al Sadd's win over Al-Duhail. In the Qatar Stars League and after winning against Umm Salal with a score of 3–0, Bounedjah scored a goal which secured the club's 15th league title. He ended the season as the league’s top scorer, with 21 goals; it was his third time winning the QSL golden boot.

International career
In September 2011, Bounedjah was called by Azzedine Aït Djoudi up to the Algeria under-23 national team. He participated with the team in a pair of friendlies against USM Blida and NA Hussein Dey.

On 4 October 2011, Bounedjah received a surprise call-up to the Algeria national team from Vahid Halilhodžić for the 2012 Africa Cup of Nations qualifier against Central African Republic, replacing the injured Rafik Djebbour.

On 16 November 2011, he was selected as part of Algeria's squad for the 2011 CAF U-23 Championship in Morocco.

Bounedjah scored the only goal for Algeria against Senegal in the 2nd minute of the 2019 Africa Cup of Nations Final in Egypt, from a shot that took a massive deflection off Senegalese defender Salif Sané, in a match that ended with a 1–0 win for Algeria.

Career statistics

Club

International

Scores and results list Algeria's goal tally first, score column indicates score after each Bounedjah goal.

Scores and results list Algeria U23's goal tally first, score column indicates score after each Bounedjah goal.

Honours
Étoile du Sahel
 Tunisian Cup: 2013–14, 2014–15
 CAF Confederation Cup: 2015

Al Sadd
 Qatar Stars League: 2018–19, 2020–21, 2021–22
 Qatar Cup: 2017, 2020, 2021
 Emir of Qatar Cup: 2017, 2020, 2021
 Sheikh Jassim Cup: 2017, 2019
 Qatari Stars Cup: 2019-20

Algeria
 Africa Cup of Nations: 2019
FIFA Arab Cup: 2021

Individual
 Algerian Footballer of the Year: 2018
 Tunisian Ligue Pro 1 Top Goalscorer: 2013–14
 CAF Confederation Cup Top Goalscorer: 2015
 Qatar Stars League Player of the Month: August 2018, November/December 2018, January 2021, September 2021
 Qatar Stars League Top Goalscorer: 2018–19, 2020–21
 Qatar Stars League Team of the Year: 2017–18, 2018–19, 2019–20
Emir of Qatar Cup Top Goalscorer: 2017
 AFC Champions League Top Goalscorer: 2018
 AFC Champions League Fans' Best XI: 2018
 AFC Champions League OPTA Best XI: 2018
 IFFHS World's Best Top Goal Scorer: 2018
 IFFHS World's Best International Goal Scorer: 2018
 IFFHS World's Best Top Division Goal Scorer: 2019
 FIFA Club World Cup Top Goalscorer: 2019
 CAF Team of the Year: 2015
 Goal Africa Team of the Year: 2018
IFFHS CAF Men Team of The Year: 2021

References

External links

 

Living people
1991 births
Association football forwards
Footballers from Oran
Algerian footballers
Algerian expatriate footballers
Algerian expatriate sportspeople in Tunisia
Expatriate footballers in Tunisia
Algeria international footballers
Algeria under-23 international footballers
Algeria youth international footballers
Algeria A' international footballers
2011 CAF U-23 Championship players
Footballers at the 2016 Summer Olympics
Olympic footballers of Algeria
2017 Africa Cup of Nations players
2019 Africa Cup of Nations players
Algerian Ligue Professionnelle 1 players
Tunisian Ligue Professionnelle 1 players
RCG Oran players
USM El Harrach players
Étoile Sportive du Sahel players
Al Sadd SC players
Qatar Stars League players
21st-century Algerian people
2021 Africa Cup of Nations players